Javaris Drequis “Dee” Virgin (born October 29, 1993) is an American football cornerback for the Orlando Guardians of the XFL. He played college football at West Alabama.

Professional career

Houston Texans
Virgin signed with the Houston Texans as an undrafted free agent on May 12, 2017. He was waived by the Texans on September 6, 2017 and was re-signed to the practice squad. He signed a reserve/future contract with the Texans on January 1, 2018.

On September 1, 2018, Virgin was waived by the Texans.

Detroit Lions
On September 2, 2018, Virgin was claimed off waivers by the Detroit Lions. On October 2, 2018, Virgin was waived by the Lions and was re-signed to the practice squad. He was promoted to the active roster on December 22, 2018.

Virgin re-signed with the Lions on April 21, 2020. He was waived on September 5, 2020 and signed to the practice squad the next day. He was elevated to the active roster on September 19 and November 25 for the team's weeks 2 and 12 games against the Green Bay Packers and Houston Texans, and reverted to the practice squad after each game. Virgin was released on December 17, 2020.

Los Angeles Rams
On December 22, 2020, Virgin signed with the practice squad of the Los Angeles Rams. He was released on December 29, 2020.

New England Patriots
On January 1, 2021, Virgin was signed to the New England Patriots active roster. He was waived on August 31, 2021.

San Francisco 49ers
On September 3, 2021, Virgin was signed to the San Francisco 49ers practice squad. He was released on September 21, 2021.

Chicago Bears
On December 1, 2021, Virgin was signed to the Chicago Bears practice squad. He was waived on January 4, 2022.

Orlando Guardians 
On November 17, 2022, Virgin was drafted by the Orlando Guardians of the XFL.

References

External links
West Alabama Tigers bio

1993 births
Living people
American football cornerbacks
Chicago Bears players
Detroit Lions players
Houston Texans players
Los Angeles Rams players
New England Patriots players
Orlando Guardians players
People from Donalsonville, Georgia
Players of American football from Georgia (U.S. state)
San Francisco 49ers players
West Alabama Tigers football players